Cymindis seriata is a species of ground beetle in the subfamily Harpalinae. It was described by Hatch in 1953.

References

seriata
Beetles described in 1953